Pierzchała is a Polish surname. Notable people with this surname include:

 Elżbieta Pierzchała (born 1954), Polish politician
 Piotr Pierzchała (born 1999), Polish footballer

See also
 

Polish-language surnames